Mersey  was a ship launched at Chittagong in 1801 and wrecked in the Torres Strait, Australia, about mid-June 1804. She was the first merchantman lost in the Strait.

Mersey was built in Chittagong in 1801 and registered at Fort William, India. At the time of her loss her captain and owner was James Wilson.

Mersey, Captain Wilson, arrived at Sydney on 10 April 1804 with a cargo chiefly consisting of sugar, port and Madeira wine, cordage, and some piece goods. An advertisement on 22 April announced the sale on Monday 23 April of Merseys cargo. The advertisement provided a rich, detailed listing of the cargo.

Philip Gidley King, governor of New South Wales, on 15 May 1804 announced that Mersey would return to India via an "hithertoo unfrequented passage to Torres Strait in the track of Captain Flinders." King had chartered Mersey to purchase 250 cows from Bengal and deliver them to Hobart, Tasmania.

Mersey left Port Jackson on 24 May 1804 for Bengal with a cargo of 1632 feet of timber. While passing through the Torres Strait, Mersey was totally wrecked. The whaler  brought the news on 17 November 1804 from Timor.

Only 17 crew and the captain were saved by sailing in a longboat to Timor; 56 others had perished. After refitting the longboat at Dili the survivors reached Bencoolen from where they sailed to Madras on an Acehen vessel. Captain Wilson arrived in Calcutta 20 September 1804 on board Margaret, from Madras.

See also 
Mersey (1894 ship)

Citations and references
Citations

References
 
 
 
 

Maritime history of Australia
Shipwrecks in the Pacific Ocean
History of New South Wales
Maritime incidents in 1804
1801 ships
British ships built in India